The Artemis Accords is a non-binding multilateral arrangement between the United States government and other world governments participating in the Artemis program, an American-led effort to return humans to the Moon by 2025, with the ultimate goal of expanding space exploration to Mars and beyond. As of December 2022, 23 countries and one territory have signed the accords, including eight in Europe, seven in Asia, three in North America, two in Oceania, two in Africa, and two in South America.

Drafted by NASA and the U.S. Department of State, the Accords establish a framework for cooperation in the civil exploration and peaceful use of the Moon, Mars, and other astronomical objects. They are explicitly grounded in the United Nations Outer Space Treaty of 1967, which signatories are obliged to uphold, and cite most major U.N.-brokered conventions constituting space law.

The Accords were signed on 13 October 2020 by representatives of the national space agencies of eight countries: Australia, Canada, Italy, Japan, Luxembourg, the United Arab Emirates, the United Kingdom and the United States. Additional signatories include Ukraine, South Korea, New Zealand, Brazil, Poland, Mexico, Israel, Romania, Bahrain, Singapore, Colombia, France, Saudi Arabia, Rwanda, and Nigeria. The Accords remain open for signature indefinitely, as NASA anticipates other nations will join. Additional signatories to the Accords can choose to directly participate in Artemis program activities or may agree simply to commit to the principles for responsible exploration of the moon that are set out in the Accords.

History 
On 5 May 2020, Reuters published an exclusive report that the Trump administration was drafting a new international agreement for mining on the Moon, which would draw from the 1967 Outer Space Treaty. Ten days later, NASA Administrator Jim Bridenstine officially announced the Artemis Accords, a series of agreements with partner nations aimed at establishing a governing framework for exploring and mining the Moon.

The Accords originated from the eponymous Artemis Program, an American plan launched in 2017 to send the first woman and the next man to the Moon by 2024. Bridenstine stated that the agreements were intended to create a uniform set of guidelines for countries to avoid potential conflict or misunderstanding in future space endeavors; governments that sign the Accords may formally take part in the Artemis Program.

The Accords were drafted by NASA and the U.S. Department of State and the newly re-established National Space Council; a draft was released to several governments for consultation before the final document was announced in May 2020.

On 13 October 2020, in a recorded and livestreamed ceremony, the Accords were signed by the directors of the national space agencies of the United States, Australia, Canada, Japan, Luxembourg, Italy, the United Kingdom, and the United Arab Emirates. The head of the Ukrainian national space agency signed the Accords exactly one month later.

On 24 May 2021, South Korea became the tenth country to sign the Accords, with New Zealand joining a week later. The following June, Brazil became the first country in Latin America to join the Artemis Accords, after previously indicating its intent to sign in 2020.

Poland signed the accords on 26 October 2021 at the 72nd International Astronautical Congress (IAC) in Dubai, with the head of the Polish Space Agency expressing a desire to develop indigenous Polish space technology. On 9 December 2021, Mexico joined the accords.

As of July 2022, the number of signatories of the accords has more than doubled since the previous year: Israel signed the accords on 26 January 2022, followed by Romania, Bahrain, and Singapore in March; Colombia in May, and France on 7 June 2022, the 60th anniversary of the founding of its space program (pursuant to meetings in November 2021 between U.S. Vice President Kamala Harris and French President Emmanuel Macron in which he expressed France's intent to join). Saudi Arabia signed the Accords on 14 July 2022. On 13 December 2022, at the U.S.-Africa Leaders Summit, Rwanda and Nigeria became the first African nations to sign the Artemis Accords.

According to a factsheet released by the White House in 2021, India is considering signing the Accords and potentially cooperating with the U.S. in the Artemis program.

On 19 September 2022, representatives from the signatory nations met in person at the International Astronautical Congress. They discussed cooperation and the Accords.

Accords
Although a prerequisite for taking part in the Artemis Program, the Accords have been interpreted as codifying key principles and guidelines for exploring space generally. Their stated purpose is to "provide for operational implementation of important obligations contained in the Outer Space Treaty and other instruments." The Accords are a single document, signed by each country that commits to the Accords' principles.  Bilateral agreements between space agencies for specific operations on the Moon and beyond are expected to reference the Accords and implement them in particular projects.

The provisions:

 Affirm that cooperative activities under these Accords should be exclusively for peaceful purposes and in accordance with relevant international law.
 Confirm a commitment to transparency and to share scientific information, consistent with Article XI of the Outer Space Treaty.
 Call for a commitment to use reasonable efforts to utilize current interoperability standards for space-based infrastructure, and to establish standards when they do not exist or are inadequate.
 Call for a commitment to take all reasonable efforts to render necessary assistance to personnel in outer space who are in distress and according to their obligations under the Rescue and Return Agreement.
 Specify responsibility for the registration of objects in space, as required by the Registration Convention
 Call for a commitment to publicly share information on their activities and to the open sharing of scientific data. While doing so, signatories agree to coordinate with each other to provide appropriate protection for any proprietary and/or export-controlled information, and this provision does not extend to private sector operations unless conducted on behalf of a signatory.
 Include an agreement to preserve outer space heritage, which they consider to comprise historically significant human or robotic landing sites, artifacts, spacecraft, and other evidence of activity, and to contribute to multinational efforts to develop practices and rules to do so.
 Include an agreement that extraction and utilization of space resources should be conducted in a manner that complies with the Outer Space Treaty and in support of safe and sustainable activities. The signatories affirm that this does not inherently constitute national appropriation, which is prohibited by the Outer Space Treaty. They also express an intent to contribute to multilateral efforts to further develop international practices and rules on this subject.
 Reaffirm the signatories commitment to the Outer Space Treaty's provisions relating to due regard and harmful interference with other nations activities, and to provide information regarding the location and nature of space-based activities. Signatories express an intention to contribute to multilateral efforts to further develop international practices, criteria, and rules to assure this. To implement this, the Accords provide for the announcement of "safety zones", where other operations or an anomalous event could reasonably cause harmful interference. The size and scope of these safe zones should be based on the nature and environment of the operations involved and determined in a reasonable manner leveraging commonly accepted scientific and engineering principles. Within their safety zones, the signatories commit to respect the principle of free access to all areas of celestial bodies by others and all other provisions of the Outer Space Treaty.
 Include a commitment to mitigate space debris and to limit the generation of new, harmful space debris in the normal operations, break-up in operational or post-mission phases, and accidents.

Reactions

Support
The Artemis Accords have generally been welcomed for advancing international law and cooperation in space. Observers note that the substance of the Accords is "uncontentious" and represent a "significant political attempt to codify key principles of space law" for governing nations' space activities. International legal scholars also credit the agreement with helping influence space exploration in the direction of uniform standards of cooperation and peaceful use.  The Accords have also been lauded for being the first multilateral instrument to recognize, in Section 9, the presence of human cultural heritage in outer space and the need to protect it.

Criticism 
The Accords have also been criticized for allegedly being "too centered on American and commercial interests." Russia has condemned them as a "blatant attempt to create international space law that favors the United States." Beside possibly being an opportunity for China in light of the Wolf Amendment, Chinese government affiliated media has called the Accords "akin to European colonial enclosure land-taking methods." Russia and China have since reached an understanding to work together on the Chinese International Lunar Research Station concept, which is particularly for third parties, like India, a possibly competing proposal to choose from.

Two researchers writing in Science magazine's Policy Forum have called on countries to speak up about their objections, and argued that the United States should go through the United Nations treaty process in order to negotiate on space mining. They were concerned NASA's Accords, if accepted by many nations, would enable the Accords' interpretation of the Outer Space Treaty to prevail. Acceptance of the Artemis Accords is a prerequisite for participation in NASA's Artemis lunar program.

Critics also contend that since the Outer Space Treaty expressly forbids nations from staking claim to another planetary body, the Accords violate space law by allowing signatories to lay claim to any resources extracted from celestial objects. Frans von der Dunk of the University of Nebraska-Lincoln claims the Accords strengthen "the US interpretation of the Outer Space Treaty", namely "the basic right for individual States to allow the private sector to become engaged" in commercial activities. The weakened alternative interpretation is that "unilateral approval of commercial exploitation is not in compliance with the Outer Space Treaty, and that only an international regime, notably—presumably—including an international licensing system, could legitimise such commercial exploitation."

With Australia signing and ratifying both the Moon Treaty as well as the Artemis Accords, there has been a discussion if they can be harmonized. In this light an Implementation Agreement for the Moon Treaty has been advocated for, as a way to compensate for the shortcomings of the Moon Treaty and to harmonize it with other laws, allowing it to be more widely accepted.

See also
 Politics of outer space
 Space law
 Moon Treaty
 Artemis Accords.

Notes

References

External links
 The Artemis Accords at NASA

International space agreements
2020 in international relations
Artemis program
2020 in space
Missions to the Moon